Guillermo Baldwin (17 July 1910 – 3 December 1986) was a Peruvian sports shooter. He competed in the 300 metre rifle event at the 1956 Summer Olympics.

References

1910 births
1986 deaths
Peruvian male sport shooters
Olympic shooters of Peru
Shooters at the 1956 Summer Olympics
Sportspeople from Callao
Pan American Games medalists in shooting
Pan American Games silver medalists for Peru
Pan American Games bronze medalists for Peru
Shooters at the 1959 Pan American Games
20th-century Peruvian people